In mathematics, a moment matrix is a special symmetric square matrix whose rows and columns are indexed by monomials. The entries of the matrix depend on the product of the indexing monomials only (cf. Hankel matrices.)

Moment matrices play an important role in polynomial fitting, polynomial optimization (since positive semidefinite moment matrices correspond to polynomials which are sums of squares) and econometrics.

Application in regression
A multiple linear regression model can be written as

Given observations , we have a system of  linear equations that can be expressed in matrix notation.

or

and

See also
 Design matrix
 Gramian matrix
 Projection matrix

References

External links
 

Matrices
Least squares